Air Caledonian was an airline based in Prestwick, Scotland. It was a short-lived airline operating services from Prestwick to the Scottish islands. Its main base was Glasgow Prestwick International Airport. It ceased operations in 2005.

Code data 
ICAO Code: CSF

History 
The airline was established in 2003 and started operations on 6 December 2004. It ceased operations in January 2005. It was wholly owned by Clasair.

Fleet 
The Air Caledonian fleet consisted of 1 Embraer EMB-110P1 Bandeirante aircraft.

See also
 List of defunct airlines of the United Kingdom

External links 

Airlines established in 2003
Airlines disestablished in 2005
Defunct airlines of Scotland
Companies based in South Ayrshire
2003 establishments in Scotland
2005 disestablishments in Scotland
Defunct airlines of the United Kingdom
British companies disestablished in 2005
British companies established in 2003